Elia Rigotto (born 4 March 1982 in Vicenza) is an Italian former professional road bicycle racer. During his career, he rode with Domina Vacanze, Team Milram and Serramenti PVC Diquigiovanni–Androni Giocattoli.

Major results 

2003
 1st Stage 5 Vuelta a la Comunidad de Madrid
2004
 1st Trofeo Zsšdi
 1st Grand Prix Joseph Bruyère 
 1st Menton-Savona
 1st Prologue, Stages 4 & 6 Giro delle Regioni
 2nd Trofeo Alcide Degasperi
2nd Coppa San Geo 
 3rd Ronde van Vlaanderen U23
 4th GP Palio del Recioto
 10th Gran Premio della Liberazione 
 10th Trofeo Banca Popolare di Vicenza 
2006
 1st Stage 6 Tour Méditerranéen
 5th GP du canton d'Argovie
 9th Rund um die Hainleite
2007
 5th Dutch Food Valley Classic
2008
 1st Schaal Sels-Merksem
 4th Tour de Rijke
 5th Ronde van het Groene Hart
 6th Memorial Rik Van Steenbergen

External links 

1982 births
Living people
Italian male cyclists
Sportspeople from Vicenza
Cyclists from the Province of Vicenza